This page provides supplementary chemical data on beryllium oxide.

Material Safety Data Sheet  
Beryllium Oxide MSDS from American Beryllia

Structure and properties

Thermodynamic properties

Spectral data

References 

Chemical data pages
Chemical data pages cleanup